Teutleben is a village and a former municipality in the district of Gotha in Thuringia, Germany. Since 1 December 2011, it is part of the municipality Hörsel.

History
Within the German Empire (1871–1918), Teutleben was part of Saxe-Coburg and Gotha.

References

Former municipalities in Thuringia
Saxe-Coburg and Gotha

mk:Херзелгау